The Ahlswede–Daykin inequality  , also known as the four functions theorem (or inequality), 
is a correlation-type inequality for four functions on a finite distributive lattice. It is a fundamental tool in statistical mechanics and probabilistic combinatorics (especially random graphs and the probabilistic method).

The inequality states that if  are nonnegative functions on a finite distributive lattice such that

for all x, y in the lattice, then 

for all subsets X, Y of the lattice, where

and

The Ahlswede–Daykin inequality can be used to provide a short proof of both the Holley inequality and the FKG inequality. It also implies the XYZ inequality.

Generalizations

References

Inequalities
Theorems in combinatorics
Statistical mechanics